Union councils of Magura District are the smallest rural administrative and local government units in Magura District of Bangladesh. The district consists of 1 municipalities, 4 upazilas, 36 union porishods, mouza 537 and 730 villages.

Magura Sadar Upazila
Magura Sadar Upazila is divided into Magura Municipality and 13 union parishads.The union parishads are subdivided into 222 mauzas and 241 villages. Magura Municipality is subdivided into 9 wards and 61 mahallas.

 Atharokhada Union
 Baroil Polita Union
 Bogia Union
 Chawlia Union
 Gopalgram Union
 Hazipur Union 
 Hazrapur Union
 Jagdal Union
 Kosundi Union
 Kuchiamora Union
 Moghi Union
 Raghobdair Union
 Satrijitpur Union

Mohammadpur Upazila
Mohammadpur Upazila is divided into eight union parishads. The union parishads are subdivided into 131 mauzas and 188 villages.

 Babukhali Union
 Balidia Union
 Binodpur Union
 Digha Union
 Mohammadpur Union
 Nohata Union
 Palashbaria Union
 Rajapur Union

Shalikha Upazila
Shalikha Upazila is divided into seven union parishads. The union parishads are subdivided into 100 mauzas and 118 villages.

 Arpara Union
 Bunagati Union 
 Dhaneswargati Union
 Gongarampur Union
 Shalikha Union
 Shatakhali Union
 Talkhari Union

Sreepur Upazila
Sreepur Upazila is divided into eight union parishads. The union parishads are subdivided into 83 mauzas and 164 villages.
 Amalsar Union
 Dariapur Union
 Gayeshpur Union
 Kadirpara Union
 Nakol Union
 Shobdalpur Union
 Sreekol Union
 Sreepur Union

References 

Local government in Bangladesh